Gérard Monrazel (born 30 April 1943) is a French bobsledder. He competed in the four-man event at the 1968 Winter Olympics.

References

1943 births
Living people
French male bobsledders
Olympic bobsledders of France
Bobsledders at the 1968 Winter Olympics